Robert Ralston School is a historic school building located in the Queen Village neighborhood of Philadelphia, Pennsylvania. It was built in 1869, and is a -story, four-bay, brick building with a stucco foundation in the Gothic Revival-style. It has a later addition in an industrial style. It features a pedimented front gable, a molded wood cornice, and an ocular vent opening.  It was named after merchant and philanthropist Robert Ralston (1761-1836).

The building was added to the National Register of Historic Places in 1986.

References

School buildings on the National Register of Historic Places in Philadelphia
Gothic Revival architecture in Pennsylvania
School buildings completed in 1869
South Philadelphia
1869 establishments in Pennsylvania
Defunct schools in Pennsylvania